China National Highway 573 runs from Zêkog to  Xinghai, both in Qinghai. It is one of the new trunk highways proposed in the China National Highway Network Planning (2013 - 2030).

Route table

See also 

 China National Highways

References 

Transport in Qinghai